Oncidium naevium, the spotted oncidium, is an epiphyte that can be found in Colombia and Guyana. 

The species is endangered due to habitat destruction and constant poaching.

naevium